Warndon is a suburb and civil parish of the City of Worcester in Worcestershire, England.

The parish, which includes the villages of Trotshill and Warndon was part of Droitwich Rural District until 1974 when it was annexed to Worcester under the Local Government Act 1972. It had a population of 10,730 in 2021.

Warndon Villages
Warndon Villages is a housing development based on "village" themes on the eastern side of Worcester, situated between Warndon and the M5 motorway.

There are four distinct "villages" in the development, the Harleys, the Lyppards, the Berkeleys and the Meadows, each with their own subdivisions. The first village opened in 1996.
Warndon Villages is home to Lyppard Grange Primary School, four nurseries, a Tesco supermarket,  community centre  and a range of other facilities.

Warndon Villages borders the Berkeley Business Park which is home to a range of small businesses as well as being a logistics and distribution hub close to Junction 6 of the M5. The Berkeley Business Park is home to Worcester Bosch (a major local employer), Mazak, Plumb Center and SouthCo.

References

External links
Warndon Parish Council
1885 Ordnance Survey map of Warndon

Geography of Worcester, England
History of Worcester, England